D'Onofrio is a Peruvian brand and business dedicated primarily to the sale of confectionery products. It was founded in 1897 by Pietro D'Onofrio. The company and its brand currently belongs to Nestlé Perú (acquired in 1997) (a subsidiary of the larger Nestlé company) and sells its products in the same country. D'Onofrio's products are aimed at a wide market, and are consumed by people of all ages.

D'Onofrio also has a share of the chocolate market. Its foremost product is Sublime, a small-sized chocolate with peanuts. D'Onofrio is also famous for its panettone which is on sale for Christmas and on Peru's independence holiday on July 28. There had been many products that are seldom for sale, like juices or cookies.

History 

Italian immigrant Pietro ("Pedro") D'Onofrio (1859–1937) arrived in Argentina at 21 years old. In that country, he learnt how to make ice cream from a friend of his family, Raffaele Cimarelli. After a brief return to his born-country, D'Onofrio came back to Argentina. Cimarelli suggested him to move to Peru, to take advance of the Lima's favorable weather, considering it a good opportunity to set their business.

Following the advice, D'Onofrio and his wife moved to Lima, where they started the business, at first with only a yellow ice cream cart. In 1908 D'Onofrio acquired a plant to manufacture artificial ice.

D'Onofrio soon expanded his business to chocolate, manufactured with technology from Europe. Other products included cookies and candies. D'Onofrio died in 1937, being succeeded by his son Antonio, which took over the company and introduced new products to afford the increasing demand. In 1997, the company was acquired by the Peruvian subsidiary of Nestlé.

Ice-cream brands
D'Onofrio holds a large variety of ice creams with different flavors. Approximately 20 types of ice creams are sold throughout D'Onofrio stores and ice cream carts. Among the products are:

 Alaska
 Copa
 Bombones
 Buen Humor
 Copa K-bana
 Eskimo
 Frio Rico
 Huracán
 Jet
 Morochas
 Princesa
 Dono Sándwich
 Sandwich-ito
 Sin Parar
 Sublime
 Bebe 
Pezi Duri

Beach Delivery

Donofrio provides a delivery service, employing people along the coasts. They walk with coolers slung on their shoulders, with ice cream you can buy directly from them on the beach.

References

External links 

 
 Fotografía antigua de una carretilla 

Peruvian brands
Nestlé brands
Ice cream brands
Economy of Lima